Matthew Lottich (born July 29, 1982) is an American basketball coach who is the current head coach of the Valparaiso University men's basketball team. He was named head coach on April 7, 2016, one day after Bryce Drew left the program. Lottich had been an assistant at Valparaiso since 2013. He went to New Trier High School in Winnetka, IL where he was an all-state athlete in basketball, baseball, and as a quarterback in football. He played collegiately at Stanford University, where he earned Honorable Mention All-Pac-10 accolades as a senior. After college, Lottich played professional basketball internationally. He played in New Zealand for the Harbour Heat of the NBL in 2004. He played two stints for the Japanese bj league with the Osaka Evessa from 2005 to 2008, and the Oita Heat Devils from 2009 to 2012. Lottich also played in the Bundesliga for the Düsseldorf Giants from 2008 to 2009.

Head coach career record

References

External links
Valparaiso Profile

1982 births
Living people
American expatriate basketball people in Germany
American expatriate basketball people in Japan
American expatriate basketball people in New Zealand
American men's basketball players
Basketball coaches from Illinois
Basketball players from Illinois
Ehime Orange Vikings players
New Trier High School alumni
Osaka Evessa players
People from Winnetka, Illinois
Sportspeople from Cook County, Illinois
Stanford Cardinal men's basketball players
Valparaiso Beacons men's basketball coaches
Guards (basketball)